The 2019 FIFA Club World Cup (officially known as the FIFA Club World Cup Qatar 2019 presented by Alibaba Cloud for sponsorship reasons) was the 16th edition of the FIFA Club World Cup, a FIFA-organised international club football tournament between the winners of the six continental confederations, as well as the host nation's league champions. The tournament was hosted by Qatar between 11 and 21 December 2019, taking place at two venues in Al Rayyan.

Real Madrid, winners of the last three Club World Cup titles, were unable to defend their title, having been eliminated in the round of 16 of the 2018–19 UEFA Champions League. The eventual winners of that competition, Liverpool, went on to win the Club World Cup for the first time, beating Mexican side Monterrey 2–1 in the semi-finals, before requiring extra time to claim a 1–0 win over Flamengo in the final.

Host appointment
With proposals for an expanded Club World Cup, FIFA delayed the announcement of a host. A host was to be announced by FIFA on 15 March 2019, though this was later delayed. On 28 May 2019, FIFA announced that the 2019 and 2020 tournament host would be appointed at the FIFA Council meeting in Paris, France, on 3 June 2019.

Qatar was appointed as the host for the 2019 and 2020 tournaments on 3 June 2019, serving as test events ahead of their hosting of the 2022 FIFA World Cup. The Club World Cup retained its original format ahead of the revamp in 2021.

Qualified teams

Notes

Venues 

The tournament was held in the city of Al Rayyan, at Jassim bin Hamad Stadium and Khalifa International Stadium, which previously hosted matches at the 2011 AFC Asian Cup, including the final for the latter. A third venue in Al Rayyan, Education City Stadium, was also originally planned to host matches during the tournament, including the final. In December 2019, FIFA moved all three matches (the second semi-final on 18 December and the third place match and final on 21 December) that were due to be played at the Education City Stadium to Khalifa International Stadium after the opening of the Education City Stadium was postponed to early 2020.

Match officials
Five referees, ten assistant referees, and six video assistant referees were appointed for the tournament.

One support referee was also named for the tournament.

Squads

Each team had to name a 23-man squad (three of whom must be goalkeepers). Injury replacements were allowed until 24 hours before the team's first match.

Matches
The draw of the tournament was held on 16 September 2019, 14:00 CEST (UTC+2), at the FIFA headquarters in Zürich, to decide the matchups of the second round (between the first round winner and teams from AFC, CAF, and CONCACAF), and the opponents of the two second round winners in the semi-finals (against teams from CONMEBOL and UEFA). At the time of the draw, the identity of the teams from AFC and CONMEBOL were not known.

If a match was tied after normal playing time:
For elimination matches, extra time was played. If still tied after extra time, a penalty shoot-out was held to determine the winner.
For the matches for fifth place and third place, no extra time was played, and a penalty shoot-out was held to determine the winner.

All times are local, AST (UTC+3).

First round

Second round

Match for fifth place

Semi-finals

Match for third place

Final

Goalscorers

1 own goal
 Ali Al-Bulaihi (Al-Hilal, against Flamengo)

Final ranking
Per statistical convention in football, matches decided in extra time were counted as wins and losses, while matches decided by penalty shoot-out were counted as draws.

Awards

The following awards were given at the conclusion of the tournament. Mohamed Salah of Liverpool won the Golden Ball award, sponsored by Adidas, which is jointly awarded with the Alibaba Cloud Award to recognise the player of the tournament.

FIFA also named a man of the match for the best player in each game at the tournament.

Criticism
In 2017, three member countries of the Gulf Cooperation Council along with Egypt cut diplomatic ties with Qatar and criminalised trips for their citizens to the country. In October, FIFA sold 200 Club World Cup tickets to fans from Saudi Arabia and Bahrain, and 500 to those from the United Arab Emirates and Egypt. In November 2019, Human Rights Watch (HRW) criticised FIFA for neglecting fan welfare and selling tickets for the Club World Cup to those banned by their governments. HRW stated that FIFA should be aware of the risks that the football supporters can face in their countries and ensure that they are not exposed to the risk of harassment or prosecution.

On 5 November 2019, Liverpool Chief Executive Peter Moore assured that the Qatari authorities had permitted LGBT football fans to attend the FIFA Club World Cup matches in December 2019.

References

External links
FIFA Club World Cup Qatar 2019, FIFA.com

 
2019
2019 in association football
2019
2019–20 in Qatari football
December 2019 sports events in Asia